Squibs Wins the Calcutta Sweep is a 1922 British silent comedy film directed by George Pearson and starring Betty Balfour, Fred Groves and Hugh E. Wright. It was the sequel to the 1921 film Squibs.

Premise
Squibs wins a large sum of money on a horse race.

Cast
 Betty Balfour - Squibs Hopkins
 Fred Groves - P. C. Lee
 Hugh E. Wright - Sam Hopkins
 Bertram Burleigh - The Weasel
 Annette Benson - Ivy Hopkins
 Mary Brough - Mrs Lee
 Hal Martin - Detective
 Donald Searle - Reporter
 Tom Morris - Bob
 Sam Lewis - Nosey
 Ambrose Manning - Mr Lee

References

External links

1922 films
1920s English-language films
Films directed by George Pearson
British comedy films
British black-and-white films
British silent feature films
1922 comedy films
1920s British films
Silent comedy films